Violate This is a compilation album by Stuck Mojo. Released in 2001, the album compiles previously unreleased demos, alternate takes, b-sides, and new recordings.

Track listing
Ten Years
Revolution
Not Promised Tomorrow '97
No Pride, No Respect (Demo)
Southern Pride (Demo)
Wrathchild
Shout at the Devil
Hate Must Be a Gift (Demo)
Despise (Demo)
Twisted (Demo)
Only the Strong Survive (Demo)
Pigwalk (Mojo 427 Version)
No Regrets (Mojo 427 Version)
Propaganda (Demo)
Love Has No Color (Demo)
Hotlanta (Demo)
Babylon (Demo)
Stuck Mojo Funk (Demo)

References

2001 compilation albums
Stuck Mojo albums
Century Media Records compilation albums
Albums produced by Devin Townsend